Sir William Richard Shaboe Doll  (28 October 1912 – 24 July 2005) was a British physician who became an epidemiologist in the mid-20th century and made important contributions to that discipline. He was a pioneer in research linking smoking to health problems. With Ernst Wynder, Bradford Hill and Evarts Graham, he was credited with being the first to prove that smoking increased the risk of :lung cancer and :heart disease. (German studies had suggested a link as early as the 1920s but were forgotten or ignored until the 1990s.)

He also carried out pioneering work on the relationship between radiation and leukaemia as well as that between asbestos and lung cancer, and alcohol and breast cancer. He however, initially for many years, stood in opposition to research done by Alice Stewart which connected radiation exposure of pregrant mothers to development of leukaemia in their children due to her 'questionable' analysis. On 28 June 2012, he was the subject of an episode of The New Elizabethans, a series broadcast on BBC Radio Four to mark the Diamond Jubilee of Queen Elizabeth II, dealing with 60 public figures from her reign.

Biography
Doll was born at Hampton, Middlesex (now part of south-west London) into an affluent family, though his father's work as a doctor was cut short by multiple sclerosis. Educated first at Westminster School, Doll originally intended (against the wishes of his parents that he become a doctor like his father) to study mathematics at Trinity College, Cambridge. Doll claimed to have failed the mathematics scholarship from the effects of drinking 3 pints of the College's 8% alcohol own-brewed beer the night before. 

He subsequently chose to study medicine at St Thomas's Hospital Medical School, King's College London from where he graduated in 1937. Doll was a socialist, and one of the significant figures in the Socialist Medical Association whose campaign helped lead to the creation of Britain's postwar National Health Service.  He joined the Royal College of Physicians after the outbreak of World War II and served for much of the war as a part of the Royal Army Medical Corps on a hospital ship as a medical specialist.

After the war, Doll returned to St Thomas's to research asthma. In 1948 he joined a research team under Dr Francis Avery-Jones at the Central Middlesex Hospital, run under the auspices of the statistical research unit of the Medical Research Council. Over a 21-year career in the unit, Doll rose to become its director. His research there initially focused on the role of occupational factors in causing peptic ulcers. 

In 1950, he undertook, with Austin Bradford Hill, a study of lung cancer patients in twenty London hospitals, at first under the belief that it was due to the new material tarmac, or motor car fumes, but rapidly discovering that tobacco smoking was the only factor they had in common. Doll himself stopped smoking as a result of his findings, published in the British Medical Journal in 1950, which concluded:

Four years later, in 1954, the British doctors study, a study of some 40,000 doctors over 20 years, confirmed the suggestion, based on which the government issued advice that smoking and lung cancer rates were related. In 1955, Doll reported a case-controlled study that firmly established the relationship between asbestos and lung cancer.

In 1966, Doll was elected to the Royal Society. The citation stated:

In 1969, Doll moved to Oxford University, to sit as the Regius Professor of Medicine, succeeding the clinical researcher Sir George Pickering. Initially, epidemiology was held in low regard, but in his time at Oxford he helped reverse this. He was the primary agent behind the creation of Green College, which was founded in 1979. Doll was appointed the first Warden of Green College, whence he retired in 1983. Green College merged with Templeton College in 2008 to become Green Templeton College, which is located on the site that was previously Green College.

Doll also helped found the National Blood Service, and was key in avoiding a system of paying donors for their blood, as had been adopted in the United States. His continued work into carcinogens at the Imperial Cancer Research Centre at the John Radcliffe Hospital, Oxford, working as part of the Clinical Trial Service Unit, notably including a study undertaken with Richard Peto, in which it was estimated that tobacco, along with infections and diet, caused three-quarters of all cancers, which was the basis of any of the World Health Organization's conclusions on environmental pollution and cancer.

Doll was made a Fellow of the Royal Society (FRS) in 1966, knighted in 1971, and awarded the Edward Jenner Medal of the Royal Society of Medicine in 1981. Also in 1981, Doll became a founding member of the World Cultural Council. He was a member of the Norwegian Academy of Science and Letters from 1976. 

In 1996, he was made a Companion of Honour (CH) for "services of national importance". International honours included the Presidential Award of the New York Academy of Sciences as well as a United Nations Award for his research into cancer. In April 2005, he was awarded the Saudi Arabian King Faisal International Prize for medicine jointly with Peto for their work on diseases related to smoking. In 2004, he was awarded the inaugural Shaw Prize for Life Sciences and Medicine for his contribution to modern cancer epidemiology. He was also awarded honorary degrees by thirteen different universities.

He was a supporter of the Liberal Democrats at the 2005 general election.

Death
He died on 24 July 2005, at the John Radcliffe Hospital in Oxford after a short illness.

On 7 June 2015, a blue plaque was unveiled at his home at 12 Rawlinson Road.

Although raised in a Jewish family, he was an atheist.

Building

The Richard Doll Building in Headington, east Oxford, designed by Nicholas Hare Architects in 2006, was named in his honour and opened shortly before his death.
It houses the Clinical Trial Service Unit,
Cancer Epidemiology Unit and National Perinatal Epidemiology Unit. The building received an RIBA Award in 2007.
A plaque inside the building contains the following quotation from Doll:

One of the buildings of the Institute of Cancer Research in Sutton, London is also named after Sir Richard Doll.

Research funding
After Richard Doll's death, some controversy arose over aspects of his research funding when his papers, held at the Wellcome Library, indicated that for many years he had received consultancy payments from chemical companies whose products he was to defend in court.

These include US$1,500 per day consultancy fee from the Monsanto Company for a relationship which began in 1976 and continued until 2002. During this period Doll wrote to a Royal Commission in Australia investigating whether the Monsanto-produced herbicide Agent Orange, which was used during the Vietnam War, was carcinogenic, claiming that there was no evidence that it caused cancer.

He also received £15,000 from the Chemical Manufacturers Association, Dow Chemicals, and ICI for a review published in 1988 that concluded that workplace exposure to vinyl chloride did not increase the chance of contracting cancer, with the exception of angiosarcoma of the liver, contradicting two previous reviews by the World Health Organization's International Agency for Research on Cancer.

Some donations, including a £50,000 gift from asbestos company Turner and Newall, were given in a public ceremony to Green College, Oxford, but most fees and payments remained undisclosed to the public, Oxford University and colleagues until his death. His defenders point out that his connections to industry were widely known by those in the field, that he did his work before formal disclosure of commercial interests became commonplace and that on occasion, he came to conclusions that were unpalatable to the companies who consulted him. His own view, as reported by Richard Peto – who criticised the allegations, claiming they originated with people aiming to damage Doll's reputation – was that it was necessary to co-operate with companies for access to data which could prove their products to be dangerous. Peto said also that Doll gave all his fees from such work to Green College, Oxford, which he had founded.

Some controversy arose over the fact that he did not publish a paper on 'A tentative estimate of the leukaemogenic effects of test thermonuclear explosions'  in the Journal of Radiation Protection in 1955 which stated that 'there is no threshold [radiation] dose below which no effect is produced' in humans. He withdrew it on advice from Sir Harold Himsworth, Secretary of the MRC (Medical Research Council), who in turn was advised by the Atomic Energy Authority not to publish because it would be contrary to their interests. It was only published in 1996 when this kind of view was more acceptable view to the nuclear industry.

See also
 Health effects of tobacco
 Lennox Johnston

References

Further reading

Gayle Greene (1999) The Woman Who Knew Too Much:  Alice Stewart and the Secrets of Radiation University of Michigan Press

External links

 Richard Doll, An Epidemiologist Gone Awry
 Richard Doll Building by Nicholas Hare Architects LLP
 BBC News obituary Sir Richard Doll: A life's research
 BBC Experts Examined – Sir Richard Doll
 The Times obituary
 Associated Press obituary
 The Independent obituary
 Godfather of Anti-smoking Movement Dies At 92
 Interview with Richard Doll
 Richard Horton in The New York Review of Books 
 
 The Guardian (Sarah Boseley) Company paid for published review
 The Guardian (Sarah Boseley) Intervention in Vietnam inquiry
 An Epidemiologist at Work: The Personal Papers of Sir Richard Doll
 Royal Society nomination
 

1912 births
2005 deaths
People educated at Gibbs School
People educated at Westminster School, London
Alumni of King's College London
Alumni of St Thomas's Hospital Medical School
Fellows of Christ Church, Oxford
Members of the Order of the Companions of Honour
Founding members of the World Cultural Council
Members of the Norwegian Academy of Science and Letters
British epidemiologists
English statisticians
Royal Army Medical Corps officers
Biostatisticians
British medical researchers
Fellows of the Royal Society
Foreign associates of the National Academy of Sciences
English humanists
English atheists
Knights Bachelor
Officers of the Order of the British Empire
People from Hampton, London
English socialists
Royal Medal winners
Regius Professors of Medicine (University of Oxford)
Wardens of Green College, Oxford
National Health Service people
Liberal Democrats (UK) people
Tobacco researchers
British Army personnel of World War II
Members of the National Academy of Medicine